Corinne Noel Brinkerhoff (born 1979) is an American television writer and producer. She has worked on the series The Good Wife and Boston Legal. She was nominated for a Writers Guild of America Award for best new series in 2010.

Background
Brinkerhoff was born in Lawrence, Kansas, and graduated from Lawrence High School. She is an alumna of Truman State University, initially majoring in aerospace engineering, with a minor in creative writing. She changed majors, graduated, and took graduate studies at the Boston University College of Communication.

Career

Boston Legal
Brinkerhoff began working in television in 2004 as the executive assistant to showrunner David E. Kelley on Boston Legal. She became a writer in 2006, writing nine episodes in the entire series' run. In 2007, she became a story editor and was promoted to executive story editor in 2008.

The Good Wife
She became a co-producer and writer for new legal drama The Good Wife in 2009, writing 10 episodes over the course of 67 episodes produced. Brinkerhoff and the writing team were nominated for the Writers Guild of America Award for best new television series in 2010 for their work on the first season of The Good Wife.

Elementary to present
From 2012 to 2013, Brinkerhoff was co-executive producer for the television series Elementary, writing three episodes and a teleplay for another. In 2014, she was co-executive producer for the short-lived series Reckless, writing one episode. She wrote an unnamed pilot episode before becoming co-executive producer and writer for the television series Jane the Virgin from 2014 to 2015.

In 2016, she created the series American Gothic, of which she is showrunner, executive producer and writer. She is also executive producer for the series No Tomorrow that debuted in 2016.

Filmography

References

External links
 

1979 births
American television producers
American women television producers
American television writers
Boston University College of Communication alumni
Truman State University alumni
Living people
People from Lawrence, Kansas
American women television writers
Screenwriters from Kansas
21st-century American women